The 1968 Colorado Buffaloes football team represented the University of Colorado in the Big Eight Conference during the 1968 NCAA University Division football season. Led by sixth-year head coach Eddie Crowder, Colorado finished the regular season at 4–6 (3–4 in Big 8, fourth), and played their home games on campus at Folsom Field in Boulder, Colorado.

Colorado featured eighteen sophomores on the two-deep depth chart and endured an up-and-down season, including the second straight win over Oklahoma in Boulder to improve to 4–2, but then lost four straight in November to conclude the season. The finale was the first loss to Air Force in five years; the Falcons finished at 7–3.

This was the Buffs' first losing season in four years; their next came five years later.

Schedule

Personnel

Roster

Coaching staff
Head coach: Eddie Crowder
Assistants: Ken Blair (offense), Pat Culpepper (defense), Chet Franklin (offense), Don James (defense), Jim Mora (defense), Steve Ortmayer (offense), Augie Tamariello (offense), Dan Stavely (freshman)

References

External links
University of Colorado Athletics – 1968 football roster
Sports-Reference – 1968 Colorado Buffaloes

Colorado
Colorado Buffaloes football seasons
Colorado Buffaloes football